Bluffton is a hamlet in central Alberta, Canada within Ponoka County.

History 
In 1961, Bluffton was home to a Montalbetti pasta factory, which produced 3500-4000 pounds of spaghetti, macaroni, and vermicelli per day.[3] The factory produced roughly one million pounds of pasta per year, and was sold throughout Alberta and Saskatchewan. The factory, which opened in November 1961, existed until at least 1963, but no longer exists today.

Demographics 

See also 
List of communities in Alberta
List of designated places in Alberta
List of hamlets in Alberta

References 

Hamlets in Alberta
Designated places in Alberta
Ponoka County